Anny (sometimes Anni) Konetzni (February 12, 1902 – September 6, 1968) was an Austrian soprano. She was the sister of soprano Hilde Konetzni.

Born in Vienna, Anny Konetzni was a pupil of Erik Schmedes in her hometown, making her debut in Chemnitz as a contralto in 1927. Soon she became a dramatic soprano, singing at the Berlin Staatsoper from 1931 until 1935 and at the Vienna State Opera from 1935 until 1954. She tackled all the heavier parts in the operas of Richard Wagner. Konetzni bowed at the Royal Opera House in 1935 as Brünnhilde in Der Ring des Nibelungen; she had made her Metropolitan Opera debut as Brünnhilde the previous year. She returned to London every year until World War II, and again in 1951. Anny Konetzni died in Vienna.

Awards 

 1935: Appointment as Austrian chamber singer
 1955: Honorary membership of the Vienna State Opera

References

1902 births
1968 deaths
Austrian operatic sopranos
20th-century Austrian women opera singers
Musicians from Vienna